Yoshinobu Oyakawa (born August 9, 1933) is an American former competition swimmer, Olympic champion, and former world record-holder in the 100-meter backstroke. Oyakawa is considered to be the last of the great "straight-arm-pull" backstrokers and still holds the world record in this technique.

Biography
Oyakawa was born in Kona, Hawaii to the Rev. and Mrs. Edward Oyakawa and raised in Papaikou. He has an older sister, Dorothy, and an older brother, Ensie Michio.

Career

College 
Oyakawa attended Ohio State University, where he won six Big Ten, seven NCAA, and nine NAAU championships.

Olympics 
Oyakawa represented the United States at the 1952 Summer Olympics in Helsinki, Finland, where he won the gold medal in the 100-meter backstroke event.

He returned to Olympic competition at the 1956 Summer Olympics in Melbourne, Australia, where he was elected co-captain along with Ford Konno. He finished 8th in the 100-meter backstroke competition.

Coaching 
Oyakawa became a teacher and coached swimming at Oak Hills High School from 1960 to 1985. He led Oak Hills to 23 conference championships and was named League Coach of the Year 23 times and Southwest Ohio Swimming Coach of the Year 12 times.

Honors 
 Yoshinobu Oyakawa Day proclaimed by Big Island County Chairman James Kealoha on September 12, 1952 
 International Swimming Hall of Fame, 1973
 Ohio High School Coach of the Year, 1972
 The Ohio State University Athletics Hall of Fame, 1978
 Hawaiʻi Sports Hall of Fame, 1998
 Oak Hills Athletic Hall of Fame, 2008

See also
 List of members of the International Swimming Hall of Fame
 List of Ohio State University people
 List of Olympic medalists in swimming (men)

References

External links
 
 

1933 births
Living people
American male backstroke swimmers
American military personnel of Japanese descent
Hawaii people of Japanese descent
Hawaii people of Okinawan descent
American sportspeople of Japanese descent
World record setters in swimming
Ohio State Buckeyes men's swimmers
Olympic gold medalists for the United States in swimming
Swimmers from Cincinnati
Swimmers from Hawaii
Swimmers at the 1952 Summer Olympics
Swimmers at the 1956 Summer Olympics
Medalists at the 1952 Summer Olympics
American swimming coaches
American educators of Japanese descent
20th-century American people